Alcibíades Arosemena Quinzada (20 November 1883, in Los Santos Province – 8 April 1958, in Panama City) was a Panamanian politician, who served 15th President of Panama.

He was elected as the third presidential designate by the National Assembly in 1945.

He served as First Vice President in the cabinet of Arnulfo Arias 1949–1951, and was also President of Panama from 9 May 1951 to 1 October 1952. He belonged to the Authentic Revolutionary Party (PRA).

He was married to Heliodora Arosemena (1886–1980) who was a sister of former president Juan Demóstenes Arosemena.

References

1883 births
1958 deaths
People from Penonomé District
Presidents of Panama
Vice presidents of Panama